The Allegheny Mountains  are a small group of mountains  west of the Clark Mountains in the Ford Ranges of Marie Byrd Land. They were discovered on aerial exploration flights in 1934 by the Byrd Antarctic Expedition and subsequently mapped from aerial flights and ground surveys by the U.S. Antarctic Service from 1939 to 1941.  They were named by the U.S. Antarctic Service for Allegheny College, Meadville, Pennsylvania which is the alma mater of Paul Siple, leader of the U.S. Antarctic Service West Base.

References
 

Ford Ranges